St Vincent's College (colloquially known as Vinnies), is an independent Roman Catholic single-sex secondary day and boarding school for girls, located in Victoria Street, Potts Point, an inner-city suburb of Sydney, New South Wales, Australia.

The college is the oldest registered Catholic girls' school in Australia, founded by the Sisters of Charity as a co-educational primary school in 1858. St Vincent's College follows the spirituality of Ignatius of Loyola. The college has a non-selective enrolment policy and currently caters for approximately 714 girls in Years 7 to 12, including approximately 61 boarders.

St Vincent's is affiliated with the Association of Heads of Independent Schools of Australia (AHISA), the Australian Boarding Schools' Association (ABSA), the Alliance of Girls' Schools Australasia (AGSA), and is a member of the Association of Heads of Independent Girls' Schools (AHIGS).

History
St Vincent's College was founded as the Victoria Street Roman Catholic School, by the Sisters of Charity in 1858, a year after the sisters established St Vincent's Hospital at the same site.

The school reopened as St Vincent's College, a secondary, fee-paying, private, independent school in May 1882, after the hospital's relocation to the neighbouring suburb of Darlinghurst. In 2009 Mary Aikenhead Ministries (MAM) was established by the Holy See at the request of the Congregation of the Religious Sisters of Charity of Australia and the St Vincent's College was transferred to MAM. In 2018 St Vincent's College celebrated its 160th anniversary and in 2019 its 135th year of boarding.

Principals

Notable alumnae 
Lyn Ashley – actress
Natarsha Belling – journalist and newsreader
Kerrie Biddell – an Australian jazz and session singer, as well as a pianist and vocal teacher.
Grace Boelke – one of the first female graduates in medicine from the University of Sydney
Kerry Bray – awarded OAM in 2020 for 40 years of organising community running.
Kathleen Commins (1909 – 2003) was an Australian journalist, the first female editor of Australia's oldest literary journal, Hermes (in 1931). Commins joined The Sydney Morning Herald in 1934 and became the first female sports writer in Australia, then became the first female executive at The Sydney Morning Herald, as Assistant to the Chief of Staff from 1948 – 1969.
 Melinda Gainsford-Taylor – Australian athlete and Olympian
 Alexandra Hargreaves – rugby player
 Deni Hines – singer and actress
 Winnie Kiap – Papua New Guinea High Commissioner to the United Kingdom
 Karen Krantzcke (deceased) – tennis player – ranked seventh in women's tennis singles in 1970. The WTA named an award – The Karen Krantzke Sportsmanship Award in her honour.
 Neta Maughan –  an Australian piano teacher, was appointed a Member of the Order of Australia in 2010 "For service to music education as a teacher of piano, voice and music theory, to professional organisations, and as a mentor of young performers".
 Professor Anne Mijch – responsible for opening the first AIDS clinic in Melbourne. Awarded OAM in 1998 for service to medicine, particularly in the treatment and care given to patients suffering from infectious diseases including HIV/AIDS.
 Marjorie O'Neill – Member of the New South Wales Parliament for Coogee
 Colleen Pyne – awarded OAM in 1999 for services to education, and to the establishment of the North Australia Research Unit
 Patricia Rolfe – journalist and foreign correspondent for the Women's Weekly
Gemma Sisia – humanitarian who established the School of St Jude in Tanzania in 2002, which "provides free, high-quality education to over 1,800 of the poorest Tanzanian children while boarding more than 1,400 students."
Kate Wild – investigative journalist and author, Walkley Award and Logie winner 
Lara Worthington – philanthropist and businesswoman

See also 

 List of non-government schools in New South Wales
 List of boarding schools in Australia
 Catholic education in Australia

References

External links
 St Vincent's College official website
 Annual reports on official website
 Mary Aikenhead Ministries website

Girls' schools in New South Wales
Catholic secondary schools in Sydney
Educational institutions established in 1858
Boarding schools in New South Wales
Potts Point, New South Wales
Catholic boarding schools in Australia
Sisters of Charity schools
Association of Heads of Independent Girls' Schools
1858 establishments in Australia
Alliance of Girls' Schools Australasia